Mandate most often refers to:
 League of Nations mandates, quasi-colonial territories established under Article 22 of the Covenant of the League of Nations, 28 June 1919
 Mandate (politics), the power granted by an electorate

Mandate may also refer to:
 Mandate (after shave), British after shave brand
 Mandate (criminal law), an official or authoritative command; an order or injunction
 Mandate (international law), an obligation handed down by an inter-governmental body
 Mandate (magazine), a monthly gay pornographic magazine
 Mandate (trade union), a trade union in Ireland
 , various ships of Britain's navy
 Mandate (typeface), a brash-brush typeface designed by R. Hunter Middleton
 The formal notice of decision from an appeals court
 A requirement for a Health maintenance organization to provide a particular product

See also
 Contract of mandate, a contract of bailment of goods without reward, to be carried from place to place, or to have some act performed about them
 Individual mandate, an often controversial government requirement for the purchase of goods by individuals
 Mandate of Heaven, a traditional Chinese concept of legitimacy used to support the rule of the kings of the Shang Dynasty and later the Emperors of China
 Divine mandate, a political and religious doctrine